Chie Aoki (青木千絵, born 1981) is a Japanese sculptor. Her sculpture work uses mediums of cloth, foam, lacquer, and she is also known for photography on rice paper. Her sculptures commonly have the shapes of amorphous human bodies, without heads or faces.

Life 
Aoki was born in 1981 in Gifu Prefecture, Japan. Her father was the curator of the Toyota Municipal Museum of Art and introduced her to Alberto Giacometti's sculptures, which depict existential struggles. She received a degree in arts and crafts from the Kanazawa College of Art in 2005, and completed graduate work in 2006. She has two daughters.

Works and themes 
Aoki's works are surreal and convey the idea of metamorphosis or transformation. Her sculptures often start as carved styrofoam blocks over which Aoki layers black lacquer, which is then polished.

Aoki's work is influenced by psychological themes seen in Edvard Munch's art.

Collections 
Aoki's works have been featured in the following collections and galleries:
 21st Century Museum of Contemporary Art, Kanazawa
 CONTEXT Art Miami
 Hyōgo Prefectural Museum of Art
 Kitakata City Art Museum
 LIXIL Gallery
 Minneapolis Institute of Art
 Sokyo Gallery
 Tama Art University

References

External links 
 Chie Aoki's blog

Japanese women sculptors

1981 births
Living people